Consumer services refers to the formulation, deformulation, technical consulting and testing of most consumer products, such as food, herbs, beverages, vitamins, pharmaceuticals, cosmetics, hair products, household cleaners, paints, plastics, metals, waxes, coatings, minerals, ceramics, construction materials plus water, indoor air quality testing, non-medical forensic testing and failure analysis.

It involves services in a wide variety of fields such as biological, chemical, physical, engineering and Web based services.

Web-based consumer services 
Evolution of Web has changed itself from the information orientation to Service orientation. Every physical service one can think of, has its web counterpart today, be it retail selling, supply chain, customer care, banking, auction and more of b2b, b2c, c2c businesses. Online appointments, online consultation, online bill-pay  have become the order of web based consumer services...

Mergers and acquisitions 
Between 1985 and 2018 around 90,700 deals within the consumer service sector have been announced. These deals cumulate to an overall value of around 2,031 bil. USD.

There have been three M&A waves in 2000, 2007 and 2016 with a current all time in 2017, where 5,839 deals with a value of 152 bil. USD have been announced.

References 

1. http://www.internetworldstats.com/stats.htm
2. https://web.archive.org/web/20081208104000/http://www.e-consultancy.com/news-blog/364106/online-banks-see-growth-among-older-web-users.html

Consumer